Wylie Cameron Grant (November 24, 1879 – November 16, 1968) was an American tennis champion.

In 1902 and 1904 he won the U.S. National Championships mixed doubles title together with Elisabeth Moore. He was the singles runner-up at the Irish Championships in 1908.

Biography
Grant was born on November 24, 1879. In 1894, Grant first entered the singles at the U.S. Championships aged 14 years 8 months and is the youngest men's singles competitor in the tournament's history. He lost in the first round to N. Lord.

In 1905 Grant and Edward Dewhurst made it to the final round of the lawn tennis doubles championship at the St. Nicholas Rink.

Grant won the singles title at the U.S. National Indoor Tennis Championships, played on wooden courts at the Seventh Regiment Armory in New York, on five occasions (1903, 1904, 1906, 1908 and 1912).

In 1914 Grant and George C. Shafer took the title from Gustave F. Touchard and William Cragin, in the championship round of the U. S. men's indoor doubles in New York City.

See also
List of US Open mixed doubles champions

References

1879 births
1968 deaths
American male tennis players
Grand Slam (tennis) champions in mixed doubles
Tennis players at the 1900 Summer Olympics
19th-century male tennis players
Sportspeople from Brooklyn
United States National champions (tennis)
Tennis people from New York (state)